Ruth Hegarty (born 1929, in Mitchell, Queensland) is an Aboriginal Elder and author.

Hegarty is well known for her non-fiction novels that document her personal history as one of the Stolen Generation.  Her first book, Is That You Ruthie?, is based on her experiences in the Cherbourg Aboriginal Mission where she lived until the age of 14. Her second novel, Bittersweet journey is her story from her early married life, her dealings with the Native Affairs Department, and her work in community politics and Indigenous organisations.

Is That You Ruthie? won the 1998 Queensland Premier's Literary Awards, Unpublished Indigenous Writer - The David Unaipon Award.

In 2010, Hegarty was a recipient of the Queensland Greats Awards.

Life
Hegarty and her mother, Ruby, were initially housed together in the dormitories at the Cherbourg Aboriginal Mission.  When Hegarty was four years old, they were separated, when Ruby was sent away to work. They only had intermittent contact from that time onwards.

At the settlement, Hegarty formed strong friendships with the other girls in the dormitories. They were constantly supervised, punished and whipped for minor misdemeanours. The girls in the dormatory stayed together for support and for protection. There was no natural justice, just strict discipline and punishment. She states:

We got whipped from babyhood - there was no age, you just got it. And this is what we got whipped with [cat o'nine tails]. It was used in the prison at the time, and they were using it on us as children.

It isn't any different from a prison - it is exactly like it, except that we weren't inmates; we were children, and we'd done nothing wrong, absolutely nothing wrong at all. 

In 1943, Hegarty was sent away from the Cherbourg settlement to work as a domestic servant. Travelling to her new job, at the age of 14, she travelled alone for the first time in her life. She did not know the people she was travelling to work for and she felt very isolated and vulnerable.

In the 1960s, after accessing her records from Cherbourg, when she found that many of the letters she had written to her friends at the mission had not been delivered, Hegerty organised a reunion of the girls she grew up with at Cherbourg.

Ruth married Joe Hegarty, whom she had known since childhood, and has a family of eight children.

For more than 30 years, Hegarty has volunteered on community projects in the areas of youth and aged services. In 1998, she was awarded the Premier's Award for Queensland Seniors Year for her services to the community.  She is a founding member of Koobara Aboriginal and Torres Strait Islander Family Resource Centre.

In the 2007 Senate enquiry in Stolen Wages, Hegerty was a member of the Queensland Stolen Wages Working Group.

Awards
 1998 Queensland Premier's Literary Awards
 2010, Queensland Greats Awards

Bibliography
Is That You Ruthie? (UQP, 1999; 2003)  ReviewReview
Bittersweet journey. (UQP, 2003)  Review

Notes

External links
 Women in Australia’s Working History Australian Workers Heritage Centre
 Ruth Hegarty
 Inquiry into Stolen Wages, Submissions and Additional Information received by the committee as at 6/06/2007 Parliament of Australia - Senate
 Taken/Ruth Portrait - Interview with Aunty Ruth Hegarty by Robert Davidson, Topology

1929 births
Living people
20th-century Australian novelists
21st-century Australian novelists
Australian memoirists
Australian women novelists
Indigenous Australian writers
Writers from Queensland
Members of the Stolen Generations
Australian women memoirists
20th-century Australian women writers
21st-century Australian women writers
Queensland Greats